Boris Vladimirovich Rytsarev (30 June 1930 in Moscow – 25 November 1995 in Moscow) was a Soviet and Russian film director.

Filmography

Director
 1958 — The Youth of Our Fathers
 1958 — Ataman Codr
 1961 — Above the Sky
 1963 — Forty Minutes before Dawn
 1964 — Valera
 1966 — Aladdin's Magic Lamp
 1969 — Funny Magic
 1972 — Lights
 1974 — Ivan and Marya
 1977 — The Princess on a Pea
 1978 — Gift of the Black Sorcerer
 1979 — Take Me with You
 1980 — Granddaughter of Ice
 1983 — Apprentice Healer
 1986 — Sitting on the Golden Porch
 1988 — Name
 1992 — Emelya the Fool and Elena the Beautiful

Scenario
 1958 — The Youth of Our Fathers
 1963 — Do Not Cry, Alyonka (short film)
 1979 — Take Me with You
 1980 — Granddaughter of Ice
 1986 — Sitting on the Golden Porch
 1992 — Emelya the Fool and Elena the Beautiful

References

External links

Russian film directors
1930 births
1995 deaths
Gerasimov Institute of Cinematography alumni
Soviet film directors
Deaths from cancer in Russia
Fantasy film directors